Little Tragedies may refer to:

 , four short plays by Alexander Pushkin (1830)
 Little Tragedies (film), a 1979 Soviet television miniseries adaptation of Pushkin's works
 Little Tragedies (rock group), a Russian band